FC Aris Bonnevoie was a football club, based in Luxembourg City, in southern Luxembourg.  It is now a part of Racing FC Union Luxembourg.

History
Founded in 1922, Aris peaked in the 1960s and 1970s, when it won silverware and represented Luxembourg in European competition.  In 42 seasons in the top flight, Aris accumulated over 1,100 points, ranking it tenth amongst Luxembourgian clubs. However, Aris is perhaps most fondly remembered for its exploits in European competition, having been one of only a handful of Luxembourgian clubs to reach the second round of any European competition, and having scored a goal in the Camp Nou against Barcelona.

Aris ceased to exist in 2001, when it merged with CS Hollerich to form CS Alliance 01.  In 2005, Alliance 01 merged with two other clubs from Luxembourg City, CA Spora Luxembourg and Union Luxembourg, to form Aris' modern incarnation, Racing FC Union Luxembourg.

Honours

National Division
Winners (3): 1963–64, 1965–66, 1971–72
Runners-up (1): 1970–71

Luxembourg Cup
Winners (1): 1966–67
Runners-up (5): 1963–64, 1967–68, 1971–72, 1975–76, 1978–79

European Competition

Aris Bonnevoie qualified for UEFA European competition eleven times.

UEFA Champions League
First round (3): 1964–65, 1966–67, 1972–73

UEFA Cup Winners' Cup
First round (2): 1967–68, 1976–77
Second round (1): 1979–80

UEFA Cup
First round (4): 1962–63, 1963–64, 1971–72, 1983–84

Aris won a single tie in European competition, in the Cup Winners' Cup in 1979–80.  In the first round, Aris overcame Reipas Lahti of Finland, before losing to FC Barcelona.  Furthermore, to Aris' credit, the team scored in both legs in the tie against Barcelona, but lost 11–2 on aggregate.  In the first round of the same competition three years earlier, Aris had beaten Northern Ireland's Carrick Rangers 2–1, but went out 5–2 on aggregate.  Over the years, the club also managed draws against Linfield (also of Northern Ireland), RFC Liège (of Belgium), and ADO Den Haag (of the Netherlands),  but lost all three ties.

Overall, Aris' record in European competition reads:

References

Aris Bonnevoie
Aris Bonnevoie
Association football clubs established in 1922
Association football clubs disestablished in 2001
1922 establishments in Luxembourg
2001 disestablishments in Luxembourg